John W. Ladenburg Sr. (born September 19, 1949) is an American attorney and politician. Ladenburg was appointed to the Tacoma City Council in 1982 and elected to a full term in 1984. He was elected Pierce County Prosecuting Attorney in 1986, defeating incumbent Bill Griffies. Ladenburg served as Pierce County prosecutor for three terms before becoming the county executive in 2001. He was re-elected County Executive in 2004, terming out November 2008. One of Ladenburg's principal accomplishments in office was spearheading the development of Chambers Bay Golf Course in University Place, a municipal facility that hosted the 2010 United States Amateur and 2015 U.S. Open golf championships.  

Ladenburg was born in Leavenworth, Washington.  In 1967 he graduated from Stadium High School in Tacoma, Washington.  He received a B.A. degree in political science (honors) in 1971 and a J.D. degree in 1974, both from Gonzaga University. After graduation, he began a career as a trial attorney.  Ladenburg was involved in several high-profile criminal cases including the Federal Salmon Scam trials and the Pierce County Racketeering trials.

His wife, Connie, served two terms on the Tacoma City Council from 2002-2010, she was elected to the State Legislature in 2010 serving one term and then was elected to the Pierce County Council in 2012.  His brother, Barry, was appointed to the Sea-Tac City Council in 2008 and left office in 2010, then was elected to the Council again in 2012. His brother, David Ladenburg, is an elected Municipal Court Judge in Tacoma, serving his third term.

As County Executive, Ladenburg advocated for converting a gravel pit into what is now Chambers Bay. He is also considered largely responsible for bringing the U.S._Open_(golf) to the site in 2015.

In 2009 Ladenburg returned to private practice. He is Of Counsel at the law firm Ladenburg Law Injury Attorneys in Tacoma. He practices personal injury law with his two sons, John Ladenburg, Jr. and Erik Ladenburg.

References 

1949 births
Living people
Gonzaga University alumni
People from Leavenworth, Washington
Politicians from Tacoma, Washington
Washington (state) Democrats